The 1900 United States presidential election in North Dakota took place on November 6, 1900. All contemporary 45 states were part of the 1900 United States presidential election. Voters chose three electors to the Electoral College, which selected the president and vice president.

North Dakota was won by the Republican nominees, incumbent President William McKinley of Ohio and his running mate Theodore Roosevelt of New York. McKinley won the state but a margin of 26.59%.

With 62.12% of the popular vote, North Dakota would be McKinley's second strongest victory in terms of percentage in the popular vote after Vermont. McKinley had previously won the state four years earlier, but more than doubled his margin from 1896. Bryan would later lose North Dakota again to William Howard Taft in 1908.

Results

Results by county

See also
 United States presidential elections in North Dakota

Notes

References

North Dakota
1900
1900 North Dakota elections